Equisetum myriochaetum, also known as Mexican giant horsetail, is a species of horsetail that is native to Nicaragua, Costa Rica, Colombia, Venezuela, Ecuador, Peru and Mexico. 
It is semi-aquatic and is often found growing on riverbanks.

The species is harvested for medicinal use. In Mexico, the species is harvested and sold to treat kidney disease and type 2 diabetes. It has traditionally been used as a diuretic.

References

External links
 Ferns & Fossils - Royal Botanical Garden Edinburgh

myriochaetum
Ferns of the Americas
Flora of Colombia
Flora of Costa Rica
Ferns of Ecuador
Ferns of Mexico
Flora of Nicaragua
Flora of Peru
Flora of Venezuela
Plants described in 1908